It's All Remixed is the first remix album by Iwrestledabearonce. The album was released on June 29, 2010 as a re-release of their debut album, It's All Happening. The album features a remix of every song from the album, except for "Black-Eyed Bush".

Track listing

Personnel 
 Steven Bradley – guitars, keyboards, samples
 Dave Branch – bass
 Krysta Cameron – vocals
 John Ganey – guitars, keyboards, samples
 Mikey Montgomery – drums, backing vocals

Iwrestledabearonce albums
2010 remix albums
Century Media Records compilation albums
Electronic remix albums